= Base case =

Base case may refer to:

- Base case (recursion), the terminating scenario in recursion that does not use recursion to produce an answer
- Base case (induction), the basis in mathematical induction, showing that a statement holds for the lowest possible value of n
